Roberto Ojeda (born 14 March 1942) is a Cuban rower. He competed at the 1964 Summer Olympics, 1968 Summer Olympics and the 1992 Summer Olympics.

References

External links
 

1942 births
Living people
Cuban male rowers
Olympic rowers of Cuba
Rowers at the 1964 Summer Olympics
Rowers at the 1968 Summer Olympics
Rowers at the 1992 Summer Olympics
Pan American Games medalists in rowing
Pan American Games gold medalists for Cuba
Medalists at the 1991 Pan American Games
Rowers at the 1991 Pan American Games